This is a list of all 90 television episodes from the first seven series of the British television series All Creatures Great and Small.  Dates shown are original broadcast dates on BBC One.

The core quartet of characters — James Herriot, Siegfried Farnon, Tristan Farnon and Helen Herriot (née Alderson)  — appear, unless otherwise stated. James and Siegfried are the only two characters to appear in every episode. Tristan appears in 65 episodes, Helen in 87. The final appearances of regular cast members are also noted.

Episodes

Series 1 (1978)
Filmed in 1977, the opening credits for the first three series feature Siegfried and James driving around the Dales and, at one point, sharing a laugh in the car. This is an excerpt from the Series 1 episode "Calf Love". The bridge they drive over is in Langthwaite. It is between there and Feetham that they splash their way through the ford.

Filming: July and August 1977. Recording: September–December 1977

Series 2 (1979)
Filming: March and April 1978. Recording: May–August 1978

Series 3 (1980)
Filming: March–May 1979. Recording: June–October 1979

1980s Christmas Specials

Series 4 (1988)
After an eight-year break, the opening credits get a makeover from the last series. Whereas previously it was only Siegfried and James featured, now each central character that appears in the episode receives an isolated shot (taken directly from the episode) with their textual introduction. The opening credits for Series 5 are the same.

Series 5 (1988)

Series 6 (1989)
The opening credits hark back to that of the first run, with Siegfried driving the car and James being the passenger in an excerpt from the episode "The Rough and the Smooth". For that of the first few episodes, the footage was filmed late in 1988 or in early 1989, as there is snow on the hills. The interior car shot is updated later in the series with material from spring- and summer-time.

Later still in the series, the credits begin with Siegfried and James leaving J.R. Stubbs Provisions, getting back in the car and driving over the bridge featured in the series' first run.

Series 7 (1990)
The opening credits of the early episodes of the final series again features Siegfried and James driving around the Dales, this time from head-on rather than from the driver's side of the vehicle. For episodes involving Tristan, he is also filmed driving his convertible, wearing a flat cap and waving at two women having a picnic by the roadside.

"Knowin' How To Do It" and "If Music Be the Food of Love" feature the J.R. Stubbs opening credits.

In the closing credits, the three vets are seen exiting a shop called Players Please, next door to The Castle Tea Shop, before getting into Siegfried's car. The credits are changed later in the series, with James exiting the back of Skeldale House and being roped into assisting Siegfried in working on the latter's car. Helen and Mrs Alton also receive isolated introductions. For the final episode, the credits return to their early-series format.

References

External links
 

Lists of British period drama television series episodes
Lists of British comedy-drama television series episodes